Southern Colorado Stars are an American soccer team, founded in 2007. The indoor team is a member of the Premier Arena Soccer League (PASL), the development league for the Professional Arena Soccer League  (PASL-Pro), and plays in the Rocky Mountain Conference against teams from Albuquerque NM, Rio Rancho NM, Parker CO, Windsor CO, Golden CO, and Fort Collins CO.  The SoCo Stars have been previously known as the Pikes Peak Stars and the Colorado Rush before the beginning of the Summer 2008 season.

They play their home matches at the Colorado Sports Center in the city of Monument, Colorado. The indoor team's colors also are red and white.

Indoor Team

Winter 2007 PASL Roster

Summer 2008 PASL Roster

Year-by-year

Playoff Record

External links
 SoCo Stars Web Site

Premier Arena Soccer League teams
Soccer clubs in Colorado
Indoor soccer clubs in the United States
2007 establishments in Colorado
Association football clubs established in 2007
El Paso County, Colorado